Maui Patera is a patera, or a complex crater with scalloped edges, on Jupiter's moon Io. It is named after Māui, a Hawaiian demigod that sought fire from Mafuike. Its name was approved by the International Astronomical Union in 1979. It is located southwest of the eruptive center Maui, south of Euxine Mons, and southwest of the volcano Amirani. Due east are Monan Patera, Monan Mons, and Ah Peku Patera.

References

Volcanoes of Io (moon)